Oleksiy Valentynovich Cherednyk (or Aleksei Valentinovich Cherednik) (born 15 September 1960) is a Soviet, Tajikistani and Ukrainian former professional footballer who works as a scout for Shakhtar Donetsk.

International career
Cherednyk made his debut for USSR on 21 February 1989 in a friendly against Bulgaria.

Honours
Dnipro Dnipropetrovsk	
 Soviet Top League: 1988
 Soviet Cup: 1989

Soviet Union
 Olympic champion: 1988

References

External links
  Profile

1960 births
Living people
Sportspeople from Dushanbe
Soviet footballers
Ukrainian footballers
Tajikistani footballers
Association football midfielders
Association football defenders
Soviet Union international footballers
Soviet Top League players
Ukrainian Premier League players
Premier League players
FC Dnipro players
FC Kryvbas Kryvyi Rih players
FC Metalurh Zaporizhzhia players
CSKA Pamir Dushanbe players
Southampton F.C. players
FC Chornomorets Odesa players
Olympic footballers of the Soviet Union
Olympic gold medalists for the Soviet Union
Footballers at the 1988 Summer Olympics
Ukrainian football managers
Ukrainian Premier League managers
FC Kryvbas Kryvyi Rih managers
FC Torpedo Zaporizhzhia managers
Olympic medalists in football
Tajikistani people of Ukrainian descent
Soviet expatriate footballers
Ukrainian expatriate footballers
Ukrainian expatriate sportspeople in England
Expatriate footballers in England
Soviet expatriate sportspeople in England
Medalists at the 1988 Summer Olympics